Line 2 of the Guadalajara light rail system is the second line built to optimize public transport by urban rail. Its construction was carried out between January 1992 and June 1994. Its building cost was much higher than that of line 1 because there was no former infrastructure as was the case of line 1 and because it involved the modification of drainage collectors in order to build totally new underground infrastructure.

The inauguration of this line took place on July 1, 1994 and was headed by the then Governor of Jalisco Carlos Rivera Aceves (interim) and by the then President of Mexico Carlos Salinas de Gortari. Of the three existing lines, this is the shortest in the network and its mark is green.

Line stations

References 

Line 2 of the Guadalajara light rail system
Guadalajara light rail system